Alabinskaya is a station of the Samara Metro on First Line which was opened on 1 February 2015. It is located in Oktyabrsky district of Samara.

References

Samara Metro stations
Railway stations in Russia opened in 2015
Railway stations located underground in Russia